Seiberling is a surname. Notable people with the surname include:

Francis Seiberling (1870–1945), American politician
Frank Seiberling (1859–1955), American businessman
John F. Seiberling (1918–2008), American politician

It may also refer to:

Seiberling Rubber Company, founded by Frank Seiberling